Chercher may refer to:

Chercher province, Ethiopia
Chercher, East Azerbaijan village in Zonuzaq Rural District
"Chercher" (song), Japanese song by Kotoko